Godoya is a genus of trees in the family Ochnaceae. It is native to South America.

Taxonomy
Godoya contains 2 recognized species:
 Godoya antioquiensis
 Godoya obovata

References

Malpighiales genera
Ochnaceae